Bang Waek is a khwaeng (sub-district) of Phasi Charoen District, Bangkok's Thonburi side. The subdistrict contains 11 administrative villages.

History
It is named after Khlong Bang Waek, that runs through the area. It is a tributary of Khlong Chak Phra and flows into the Khlong Bangkok Noi.

In the early Rattanakosin period, Khlong Bang Waek and its basin considered as the tip of betel large market Talat Phlu, which is in Thon Buri District.

Geography
Bang Waek can be considered as a northern part of the district, with total area of 2.29 km2 (0.88 mi2).

Neighboring subdistricts are (from north clockwise): Bang Chueak Nang of Taling Chan District, Khuha Sawan, Bang Chak and Bang Duan with Khlong Khwang in the same district.

The prominent local temple Wat Bang Waek is in Khuha Sawan Sub-district.

References

Phasi Charoen district
Subdistricts of Bangkok